Come Closer may refer to:

Music

Albums
Come Closer (album), a 2006 album by Tarkan, or the title song
Come Closer, a 1996 album by Gregory Isaacs
Come Closer, a 2004 album by Papermoon
Come Closer, 2011 album by Big Fat Snake
Come Closer, 2006 album by Quincy Coleman
Come Closer, 2011 album by Babel Fish
Come Closer, 2008 album by Glenn Lyse
Come Closer With... Kewei, a 2010 album by Singaporean singer Kewei

Songs
"Come Closer" (Chris Andrews song), 1964
"Come Closer", a song by Chickenfoot from their 2011 album Chickenfoot III
"Come Closer" (Dee Clark song), 1964
"Come Closer", a song on the soundtrack of Kasam Paida Karne Wale Ki, sung by Salma Agha
"Come Closer", a 2007 single by Dutch jazz group Room Eleven
"Come Closer" (Miles Kane song), 2011
"Come Closer" (Wizkid song), 2017
"Come Closer", a song by Puff Johnson from 1996 album Miracle
"Come Closer", a song by Marit Larsen from 2006 album Under the Surface
"Come Closer", a song by My Morning Jacket from 2002 My Morning Jacket/Songs: Ohia Split EP and 2002 album Sweatbees
"Come Closer", a song by Michael Schenker / Michael Schenker Group from 2008 album In the Midst of Beauty
"Come Closer", a song by Dirty Pretty Things 2008 from Romance at Short Notice
"Come Closer", a song by Dutch band Delain from 2009 album April Rain
"Come Closer", a song by Ju-Taun, 2014

See also
"Come Close remix (Closer)", a 2003 remix of "Come Close" by Common with Erykah Badu, Q-Tip and Pharrell Williams
"Come Closer to Me" / "Acércate Más (Come Closer to Me)" composed by Osvaldo Farrés, covered by Nat King Cole, Perry Como and others